I Love Vienna is a 1991 Austrian comedy film directed by Houchang Allahyari. The film was selected as the Austrian entry for the Best Foreign Language Film at the 64th Academy Awards, but was not accepted as a nominee.

Cast
 Fereydoun Farrokhzad as Ali Mohamed
 Houchang Allahyari as Carpet salesman
 Marjam Allahyari as Marjam Mohamed
 Niki List as Herr Mitterbauer
 Marisa Mell as Selina
 Michael Niavarani as Ali Mohamed's nephew
 Hanno Pöschl as Rudolf Swoboda
 Trude Marlen as Frau Bechstein
 Thomas Unger-Morris as Policeman
 Günther Baumann as First interrogator
 Alwis Gallé as Second interrogator
 Haymon Maria Buttinger as Car driver
 Gesa Gross as Judith

See also
 List of submissions to the 64th Academy Awards for Best Foreign Language Film
 List of Austrian submissions for the Academy Award for Best Foreign Language Film

References

External links
 

1991 films
1991 comedy films
1990s German-language films
Austrian comedy films